The Noe Valley public toilet is a planned public toilet in the San Francisco neighborhood Noe Valley. The responsible government agency, San Francisco Recreation & Parks Department, held a press conference in October 2020 in which the department projected its construction to cost of $1.7 million. A celebration the city government had planned for the toilet was canceled due to public dissatisfaction with the price and the two year construction timeline. California State Assembly member Matt Haney, representing part of San Francisco, was one of the critics, and stated it showed the city had a "dysfunctional bureaucracy".

See also
Portland Loo

References

Further reading
 

Buildings and structures in San Francisco
Proposed infrastructure in the United States
Restrooms in the United States